Hoseynabad-e Nezhadi (also Romanized as Ḩoseynābād-e Nezhādī; also known as Ḩoseynābād) is a village in Eslamiyeh Rural District, in the Central District of Rafsanjan County, Kerman Province, Iran. At the 2006 census, its population was 15, in 7 families.

References 

Populated places in Rafsanjan County